The Daggs Falls is a plunge waterfall on Spring Creek that is located in the Darling Downs region of Queensland, Australia.

Location and features
The falls are situated directly on the roadside and there is a lookout provided.

Four other waterfalls are located in the area surrounding Killarney, including the Queen Mary Falls, Teviot Falls, Browns Falls and Upper Browns Falls.

See also

 List of waterfalls of Queensland

References

Waterfalls of Queensland
Darling Downs
Plunge waterfalls